Arsenal Atividades Desportivas Sport Club, commonly known as Arsenal, is a Brazilian football club based in Santa Luzia, Minas Gerais state.

History
The club was founded on 20 June 2006, and professionalized its football department in 2010.

Stadium
Arsenal Atividades Desportivas Sport Club play their home games at Estádio Municipal Victor Andrade de Brito, commonly known as Estádio do Frimisa. The stadium has a maximum capacity of 3,200 people.

References

Association football clubs established in 2006
Football clubs in Minas Gerais
2006 establishments in Brazil